Racquetball competitions at the 2019 Pan American Games in Lima, Peru was held between August 2 and 10, 2019 at the Racquetball courts located at the Villa Deportiva Regional del Callao cluster.

Six medal events were contested, a singles, doubles and team events for both men and women. A total of 60 athletes qualified to compete at the games.

Medal table

Medalists

Men's events

Women's events

Participating nations
A total of 14 countries qualified athletes. The number of athletes a nation entered is in parentheses beside the name of the country.

Qualification

A total of 60 racquetball athletes qualified compete. Each nation may enter a maximum of 8 athletes (four per gender). In each gender there will be a total of 30 athletes qualified, with the 2019 Pan American Championships being used to determine the countries qualified. Peru as host nation did not qualify any athletes automatically.

References

External links
Results book

 
Events at the 2019 Pan American Games
2019
2019 in racquetball